KMAG can refer to:

KMAG (FM), Arkansas country music station
Korean Military Advisory Group, Korean War military unit
Kmag (magazine), music magazine
Keswick Museum and Art Gallery, English gallery
Kevin Magnussen (K-Mag), Danish race car driver
Langbeinite (K-Mag) a potassium magnesium sulfate mineral